The Victor Valley is a valley in the Mojave Desert and subregion of the Inland Empire, in San Bernardino County in Southern California. 

It is located east of the Mojave's Antelope Valley, north of the Cajon Pass and the San Bernardino Valley, northeast of the San Gabriel Mountains, and northwest of the San Bernardino Mountains, and south of the Barstow area. The Mojave River flows northwards through the Victor Valley, primarily via underground aquifers.

Geography

Cities and towns
The Victor Valley contains four incorporated municipalities. The largest is Victorville. The rural desert valley region also has 15 unincorporated communities. 

The Victor Valley has an estimated population of 550,000. The densest population is within a  radius surrounding Victorville.

Over 100,000 population
Victorville (population 134,810)

Over 50,000 population
Hesperia (population 99,818)
Apple Valley (population 75,791)

Over 20,000 population
Adelanto (population 38,046)

Under 20,000 population
Baldy Mesa
Bell Mountain
Bryman
El Mirage
Helendale
La Delta
Lucerne Valley—separate geographic valley to east, part of "cultural/economic" Victor Valley area.
Mojave Heights
Mountain View Acres
Oak Hills
Oro Grande
Phelan
Piñon Hills
Silver Lakes
Spring Valley Lake

Transportation
The Victor Valley Transportation Center is an intermodal transit center in Victorville,  that is served by Amtrak, Greyhound, the Victor Valley Transit Authority and military shuttles to Fort Irwin. The center also serves as a Park and Ride facility for carpooling commuters.

Rail
Amtrak serves Victorville and Barstow with once-daily trips on the Southwest Chief, and connecting Amtrak California Thruway bus service several times daily. 

The planned Brightline West high-speed rail line to Las Vegas will terminate at the Victor Valley station until it is extended to Los Angeles or Palmdale.

Public transportation
Public transportation, provided by the Victor Valley Transit Authority (VVTA), serves most of cities and communities of the Victor Valley area. VVTA offers subsidized tickets for Greyhound Line busses to Barstow and San Bernardino. The Barstow Area Transit serves Barstow and its surrounding communities to the north. The two transit systems connect via the B-V Link service. Amtrak also serves the Valley at Victorville station. 

The interstate Greyhound Lines transport system busses stops at the Victor Valley Transportation Center.

Highways
Interstate 15—primary freeway through the Victor Valley.
U.S. Route 395
Historic U.S. Route 66
California State Route 18—Rim of the World Highway
California State Route 138—Pearblossom Highway

Air
Victorville Airport (Southern California Logistics Airport), charter and general aviation, no commercial passenger services.
Apple Valley Airport, general aviation, fuel, aircraft rental, flight instruction.
Hesperia Airport, general aviation.

Government
Political representation includes:
California's 8th congressional district
California's 21st State Senate district
California's 33rd State Assembly district

Education
Victor Valley College
Victor Valley Union High School District

Attractions
 Victor Valley Museum and Art Gallery—in Apple Valley.
 The California Route 66 Museum—in Victorville.
 Mojave Narrows Regional Park—at the surfacing of the Mojave River, in Victorville.
 The Mall of Victor Valley
 Victor Valley Memorial Park—in Victorville.
 Hulaville Forest, site of former folk art environment.

 Nearby summer/winter recreation
 San Gabriel Mountains + Angeles National Forest, including Wrightwood area.
 San Bernardino Mountains + San Bernardino National Forest.

See also

References

External links

  Victorvalleyca.com: Victor Valley, California website

 
Inland Empire
Regions of California
Valleys of San Bernardino County, California
Valleys of the Mojave Desert
Victorville, California